Michael J. Hill  (1949 – January 5, 2023) was an American film editor. He and his editing partner Dan Hanley had a longstanding, notable collaboration with director Ron Howard, having cut all of Howard's films from Night Shift (1982) to In the Heart of the Sea (2015). They won an Academy Award for the film Apollo 13 (1995), and the BAFTA Award for the film Rush (2013). Hill was a member of the American Cinema Editors (ACE).

Life and career
Hill was born and raised in Omaha, Nebraska, and received a criminal justice degree at the University of Nebraska at Omaha in 1972. His first job was as a guard at Chino prison in California. He then entered the film editing profession, and worked on several television programs and on two feature films before starting his association with Hanley and Howard on Night Shift (1982). After many years in California, Hill moved back to Nebraska after meeting and marrying his wife LeAnne. They have one daughter together born in the late 1980s. In addition to his continuing work on major studio films with Howard, Hill has edited independent films produced in Nebraska such as Full Ride (2001).

Apollo 13 was listed as the 48th best-edited film of all time in a 2012 survey of members of the Motion Picture Editors Guild. In addition to Apollo 13, Hanley and Hill have been nominated for Academy Awards for Howard's A Beautiful Mind (2001), Cinderella Man (2005), and Frost/Nixon (2008). Hanley and Hill's longstanding partnership, which includes 21 films through the 2015 In the Heart of the Sea, may be unique among major film editors. An important aspect of the partnership is that the two editors have developed a sufficiently uniform style that they can simply split up the scenes of each film without specialization.

Hill was elected as a member of the American Cinema Editors.

Hill died from cryptogenic organizing pneumonia at his home in Omaha, Nebraska, on January 5, 2023, at the age of 73.

Selected filmography

Films directed by Ron Howard

Films with other directors
Armed and Dangerous (Lester-1986)
Pet Sematary (Lambert-1989)
Problem Child (Dugan-1990)
Full Ride (Hoeger-2002)

See also
List of film director and editor collaborations

References

External links
 

1949 births
2023 deaths
American Cinema Editors
American film editors
Artists from Omaha, Nebraska
Best Editing BAFTA Award winners
Best Film Editing Academy Award winners
University of Nebraska Omaha alumni